Rorschach Hafen railway station is a railway station in Rorschach, in the Swiss canton of St. Gallen. It is located on the Lake line of Swiss Federal Railways. It is adjacent to a ferry terminal with service to Lindau and Wasserburg am Bodensee across Lake Constance.

Services 
 the following services stop at Rorschach Hafen:

 St. Gallen S-Bahn:
 : half-hourly service between Rorschach and Romanshorn and hourly service to Weinfelden; on Saturdays and Sundays, service every two hours from Rorschach to  via .
 : hourly service to Heiden.

References

External links 
 
 

Railway stations in the canton of St. Gallen
Swiss Federal Railways stations
Rorschach, Switzerland
Railway stations serving harbours and ports